Alfonso (or Alonso) de Aragon y Escobar (1417–1495), Duke of Villahermosa, Count of Ribagorza and Cortes and Grand Master of the Order of Calatrava, was an illegitimate son of John II of Aragon and one of his mistresses, Leonor de Escobar, daughter of Alfonso Rodríguez de Escobar.

His brothers and half brothers included Prince Charles of Trastámara and Viana (Charles IV of Navarre) and King Ferdinand II of Aragon, called the Catholic.

On August 18, 1443 he was elected Master of the Order of Calatrava and dismissed on September 19, 1445, replaced by Pedro Girón. Received the title of count of Ribagorza by his father John II in Monzón, and resigned on November 27, 1469 to be succeeded by his first son Fernando.

He fought in the War of the Castilian Succession. Capture of the Catalan castle of Amposta gave him fame during the war. He again led a group of skilled siege engineers in the Siege of Burgos in 1475.

In 1475 he was named Duke of Villahermosa by his father John II of Aragon as a reward for his loyalty and military value.

Alfonso of Aragon and Escobar died in Linares in 1485, not long after making to Pizarra, Málaga.

Marriage and children 
In 1477 Alfonso married with Leonor de Sotomayor of Portugal, daughter of Juan de Sotomayor and Isabel of Portugal with whom he had three children: 
 Fernando de Aragón y de Sotomayor (1478–1481)
 Alfonso de Aragón y de Sotomayor (1479–1513)
 María de Aragón y de Sotomayor (Zaragoza, 1485 – Piombino, 1513), wife of Roberto Sanseverino II  who was widowed in 1510 and remarried with Jacopo V Appiani, Lord of Piombino :es:Principality of Piombino.

With María Junquers, daughter of Mosen Gregorio de Junquers, he had two extramarital children: 
 Juan II de Ribagorza (1457–1528), Duchy of Moon I
 Leonor de Aragon, married to Jaime de Mila and became the first Marquess of Albayda. 
The premature death of his eldest son, Fernando, at the age of three years in 1481, would make the duchy passed to the second son of the marriage: Alfonso, who would inherit the duchy at 16 years in 1485.

See also
 Duke of Villahermosa
 Order of Calatrava
 List of Grand Masters of the Order of Calatrava

Notes

Footnotes

Bibliography 
 
 
 
 

1417 births
1495 deaths
15th-century people from the Kingdom of Aragon
Counts of Ribagorza
Dukes of Spain
101
Grand Masters of the Order of Calatrava
Illegitimate children of Spanish monarchs
Sons of kings